George Hepburn may refer to:

 George Hepburn (bishop) (died 1513), son of Adam Hepburn and brother to Patrick Hepburn, the first Earl of Bothwell
 George Hepburn (politician) (1803–1883), 19th century Member of Parliament from Otago, New Zealand